The Plectoderini are a large tribe of planthoppers in the family Achilidae, erected by Ronald Gordon Fennah in 1950.  Genera have a world-wide distribution, but are hardly represented in Europe or northern Asia.

Genera
Fulgoromorpha Lists on the Web (FLOW) lists:

 Abas (planthopper) Fennah, 1950
 Afrachilus Fennah, 1965
 Agandecca Buchanan White, 1879
 Akotropis Matsumura, 1914
 Amblycratus Uhler, 1895
 Aphypia Melichar, 1908
 Argeleusa Kirkaldy, 1906
 Aristyllis Kirkaldy, 1906
 Ballomarius Jacobi, 1941
 Bathycephala Fennah, 1950
 Benella Kirkaldy, 1906
 Betatropis Matsumura, 1914
 Brachypyrrhyllis Fennah, 1967
 Caffropyrrhyllis Fennah, 1950
 Calerda Signoret, 1864
 Callichlamys (planthopper) Kirkaldy, 1907
 Callinesia Kirkaldy, 1907
 Caristianus Distant, 1916
 Catonia (planthopper) Uhler, 1895
 Catonoides Metcalf, 1938
 Cenophron Fennah, 1969
 Cernea (planthopper) Williams, 1977
 Chroneba Stål, 1859
 Cionoderella Fennah, 1950
 Clidonisma Fennah, 1969
 Clusivius Distant, 1917
 Cnidus (planthopper) Stål, 1866 (synonym Necho Jacobi, 1910)
 Cocottea Williams, 1977
 Cythna (planthopper) Kirkaldy, 1906
 Deferunda Distant, 1912
 Epirama Melichar, 1903
 Epiusana Fennah, 1950
 Epiusanella Synave, 1959
 Eudeferunda Chen, Yang & Wilson, 1989
 Eurynomella Fennah, 1967
 Eurynomeus Kirkaldy, 1906
 Francesca (planthopper) Kirkaldy, 1906
 Gongistes Fennah, 1969
 Gordiacea (planthopper) Metcalf, 1948
 Haitiana Dozier, 1936
 Hamba (planthopper) Distant, 1907
 Hemiplectoderes Fennah, 1950
 Horcomotes Fennah, 1969
 Indorupex Fennah, 1965
 Isodaemon Fennah, 1969
 Juniperthia O'Brien, 1985
 Kardopocephalus Metcalf, 1938
 Kawanda (planthopper) Fennah, 1950
 Kawandella Synave, 1959
 Kempiana Muir, 1922
 Koloptera Metcalf, 1938
 Kosalya (planthopper) Distant, 1906
 Kurandella Fennah, 1950 (Kurandella Evans, 1966 doubtful)
 Lanuvia Stål, 1866
 Magadha (planthopper) Distant, 1906
 Magadhaideus Long & Chen, 2017
 Mahuna Distant, 1907
 Martorella Caldwell, 1951
 Metalticeps Dmitriev, 2020
 Mlanjella Fennah, 1950
 Momar (planthopper) Fennah, 1950
 Moraballia Fennah, 1950
 Neoacus Dmitriev, 2020
 Nephelesia Fennah, 1965
 Nephelia Kirkaldy, 1907
 Nyonga (planthopper) Synave, 1959
 Opsiplanon Fennah, 1945
 Paracatonia Fennah, 1950
 Paraclusivius Fennah, 1950
 Paragandecca Fennah, 1950
 Parakosalya Distant, 1917
 Paraphypia Synave, 1960
 Parargeleusa Fennah, 1950
 Paratangia Melichar, 1903
 Phenelia Kirkaldy, 1906
 Phypia Stål, 1860
 Plectoderes Spinola, 1839
 Plectoderoides Matsumura, 1914
 Plectoringa Fennah, 1950
 Prosagandecca Fennah, 1950
 Pseudhelicoptera Fowler, 1904
 Pyrrhyllis Kirkaldy, 1906
 Quadrana Caldwell, 1951
 Remosachilus Fennah, 1950
 Rhinocolura (planthopper) Fennah, 1950
 Rhotaloides Fennah, 1965
 Rupex Fennah, 1950
 Salemina Kirkaldy, 1906
 Semibetatropis Chun Liang Chen, Chung Tu Yang & Wilson, 1989
 Spino (planthopper) Fennah, 1950
 Symplegadella Fennah, 1950
 Synecdoche (planthopper) O'Brien, 1971
 Taloka (planthopper) Distant, 1907
 Tangina Melichar, 1903
 Thectoceps Williams, 1977
 Usana (planthopper) Distant, 1906
 Williamsus Özdikmen & Demir, 2007
 Xerbus O'Brien, 1971
 Zathauma Fennah, 1949

References

External links

Hemiptera tribes
Achilidae